The Battle of Barbalissos was fought between the Sasanian Persians and Romans at Barbalissos. Shapur I used Roman incursions into Armenia as pretext and resumed hostilities with the Romans. The Sassanids attacked a Roman force of 60,000 strong at Barbalissos and the Roman army was destroyed. The defeat of this large Roman force left the Roman east open to attack and led to the eventual capture of Antioch and Dura Europos three years later. This battle is only known through Shapur I's inscription at Naqsh-e Rostam.

Overview   
The battle was fought between the Sassanid Persians and Romans at Barbalissos, an old Roman town near Aleppo in modern-day Syria and close to the Euphrates River. The battle was fought in 252 when Shapur I (239-270 AD), King of the Sassanian Empire led his army from the Euphrates River and met with a Roman army 60,000 strong of legionaries, archers, and Roman cavalry. Although the number of forces of Sassanid Persians are unclear, through tactics and use of strategy Shapur I managed to win the battle and open a way through the Syrian cities and castles. The defeat was very costly for Valerian who appointed many more armies to stop Shapur I from quick advance into Roman soil and later decided to lead an army of 70,000 legionaries himself in what became known as the Battle of Edessa.

Sources 
 Kaveh Farroukh, Sassanian Elite Cavalry AD 224-642
 David S. Potter, The Roman Empire at Bay
 Res Gestae Divi Saporis

References 

Barbalissos
Barbalissos
Barbalissos
Barbalissos
253
250s in the Roman Empire
3rd century in Iran
Shapur I